Tink of S.E. is the third studio album by Washington, D.C., indie band Unrest, released in 1987 by TeenBeat Records.

The album was pressed in a run of 1,000 copies, with each copy decorated in a different way.

Critical reception
The Encyclopedia of Popular Music called the album "a thorough investigation and reflection of the group's environment, mixing trash punk cover versions ... with touching vignettes of suburban and college life."

Track listing

Personnel
Adapted from the Tink of S.E. liner notes.

Unrest
Phil Krauth – drums, bass guitar, vibraphone, percussion, backing vocals, production
Tim Moran – electric guitar, acoustic guitar, bass guitar, vocals, percussion
Mark Robinson – vocals, electric guitar, bass guitar, drums, keyboards, percussion, production
Chris Thomson – bass guitar, guitar, percussion, backing vocals

Additional musicians and production
Richard Ashman – production, engineering
Eli Janney – production
Paul Kearny – production

Release history

References

External links 
 

1987 albums
Albums produced by Mark Robinson (musician)
Unrest (band) albums
TeenBeat Records albums